Bishop Ryan Catholic School is a PK–12 private, Roman Catholic, co-educational school in Minot, North Dakota, United States. It was established in 1958 and is located in the Roman Catholic Diocese of Bismarck. It was named for Vincent James Ryan, the second bishop of the diocese.

After the 2011 Souris River flood and the flooding of the Little Flower Elementary campus, the preschool and elementary students were moved to Bishop Ryan, resulting in North Dakota's first Catholic PK-12 school.

Athletics 
Bishop Ryan's mascot is a lion, with the girls' teams referred to as the Lady Lions. The school has sports programs in football, golf, volleyball, cheerleading, track and field, baseball, softball, basketball, cross-country, and wrestling. The school competes in the Class B division, except for football in Class A.

Bishop Ryan's head coach in basketball from 1959-1964 was 24-year-old  Dale Brown, later the head coach at LSU for 25 seasons (1972–97).  Ryan's head coach in football from 1960–1962 was Ron Erhardt, later the head coach for the North Dakota State University Bison, New England Patriots and the offensive coordinator for the Pittsburgh Steelers, New York Giants and the New York Jets.

Notable alumni 
 Mark Slater, former NFL player for the San Diego Chargers and the Philadelphia Eagles

References

External links 
 

Roman Catholic Diocese of Bismarck
Schools in Ward County, North Dakota
Private elementary schools in North Dakota
Private middle schools in North Dakota
Catholic secondary schools in North Dakota
Buildings and structures in Minot, North Dakota
North Dakota High School Activities Association (Class B)
North Dakota High School Activities Association (Class AA Football)
Educational institutions established in 1958
1958 establishments in North Dakota